Intel Clear Video is a semiconductor intellectual property core which implements some steps of some video decompression algorithms. The scope is to calculate these on the SIP core rather than on the CPU. Intel Clear Video is paired with integrated graphics processors branded as Intel GMA.

Intel Clear Video HD is a set of post-processing features added to Intel Clear Video.

See also
 Intel Quick Sync Video – the successor of semiconductor intellectual property core to Intel Clear Video found on newer CPUs
 Nvidia PureVideo
 Unified Video Decoder (UVD)
 Video Coding Engine (VCE)

References

External links
 Intel Clear Video Technology archived on Wayback Machine
 Intel Clear Video HD Technology archived on Wayback Machine

Clear Video
Video acceleration